Dizicheh (also Romanized as Dīzīcheh; also known as Dīzechī, Dīzehcheh, and Dīzejī) is a village in Barzavand Rural District, in the Central District of Ardestan County, Isfahan Province, Iran. At the 2006 census, its population was 66, in 20 families.

References 

Populated places in Ardestan County